September 22 - Eastern Orthodox liturgical calendar - September 24

All fixed commemorations below celebrated on October 6 by Orthodox Churches on the Old Calendar.

For September 23rd, Orthodox Churches on the Old Calendar commemorate the Saints listed on September 10.

Feasts
 The Conception of the Glorious Prophet, Forerunner, and Baptist John.

Saints
 Saints Xanthippe and Polyxena, of Spain, disciples of the Apostles (109)
 Virgin-martyr Irais (Rhais, Raissa) of Alexandria (308)
 Martyrs Andrew and John, and his sons Peter and Antoninus, of Syracuse, martyred in Africa (9th century)

Pre-Schism Western saints
 Saint Linus, the first Pope of Rome (c. 79)  (In the East: January 4 and November 5 )
 Saint Paternus (Pair), Bishop of Avranches (c. 563) 
 Saint Constantius, sacristan of the ancient church of St Stephen in Ancona in Italy (6th century) 
 Saint Adomnán, Abbot of Iona, biographer of Saint Columba (704)
 Saint Cissa of Crowland, a disciple of St Guthlac at Crowland in England (early 8th century)

Post-Schism Orthodox saints
 New Martyr Nicholas the Grocer ("O Pantopolis"), at Constantinople (1672) 
 New Martyr John of Konitsa, Epirus, by beheading (1814)
 New Hieromartyr Gregory (Kalamaras), Metropolitan of Argos and Nauplion, Ethnomartyr (1821)

New martyrs and confessors
 New Hieromartyr John Pankratovich, Priest (1937)
 New Hieromartyr Arsenius, Archimandrite (1937)

Other commemorations
 Icon of the Mother of God of Slovenka (Solvenskaya) (1635)
 Repose of Abbess Eupraxia of Old Ladoga Convent (1823)
 Repose of Hieroschemamonk Jerome of Solovki (1847)
 Glorification (1977) of St. Innocent, Metropolitan of Moscow, Enlightener of Alaska and Siberia (1879)
 Myrrh-streaming Iveron Icon of the Theotokos "Hawaiian" (2007)

Icon gallery

Notes

References

Sources
 September 23/October 6. Orthodox Calendar (PRAVOSLAVIE.RU).
 October 6 / September 23. HOLY TRINITY RUSSIAN ORTHODOX CHURCH (A parish of the Patriarchate of Moscow).
 September 23. OCA - The Lives of the Saints.
 The Autonomous Orthodox Metropolia of Western Europe and the Americas (ROCOR). St. Hilarion Calendar of Saints for the year of our Lord 2004. St. Hilarion Press (Austin, TX). p. 71.
 The Twenty-Third Day of the Month of September. Orthodoxy in China.
 September 23. Latin Saints of the Orthodox Patriarchate of Rome.
 The Roman Martyrology. Transl. by the Archbishop of Baltimore. Last Edition, According to the Copy Printed at Rome in 1914. Revised Edition, with the Imprimatur of His Eminence Cardinal Gibbons. Baltimore: John Murphy Company, 1916. p. 294.
 Rev. Richard Stanton. A Menology of England and Wales, or, Brief Memorials of the Ancient British and English Saints Arranged According to the Calendar, Together with the Martyrs of the 16th and 17th Centuries. London: Burns & Oates, 1892. pp. 455–456.
Greek Sources
 Great Synaxaristes:  23 ΣΕΠΤΕΜΒΡΙΟΥ. ΜΕΓΑΣ ΣΥΝΑΞΑΡΙΣΤΗΣ.
  Συναξαριστής. 23 Σεπτεμβρίου. ECCLESIA.GR. (H ΕΚΚΛΗΣΙΑ ΤΗΣ ΕΛΛΑΔΟΣ).
  23/09/2016. Ορθόδοξος Συναξαριστής. 
Russian Sources
  6 октября (23 сентября). Православная Энциклопедия под редакцией Патриарха Московского и всея Руси Кирилла (электронная версия). (Orthodox Encyclopedia - Pravenc.ru).
  23 сентября по старому стилю  /  6 октября по новому стилю. Русская Православная Церковь - Православный церковный календарь на 2016 год.

September in the Eastern Orthodox calendar